The 2017 Christy Ring Cup was the 13th staging of the Christy Ring Cup hurling championship since its establishment by the Gaelic Athletic Association in 2005.  The competition began on 22 April 2017 and ended on 10 June 2017.

Meath were the 2016 champions and were promoted to the All-Ireland Senior Hurling Championship. Mayo returned to the Christy Ring Cup after gaining promotion from the Nicky Rackard Cup.

On 10 June 2017, Carlow won the Christy Ring Cup following a 5-23 to 4-15 defeat of Antrim. This was their third Christy Ring Cup title, their first in eight seasons.

Format

The 2017 Christy Ring Cup begins in a double-elimination format which ensures that each team plays at least two games before being eliminated, and at least three games in total (including the relegation play-off). At the quarter-final stage, the competition becomes straight knockout. For clarity, the fixtures and draw details are explained in the section for each round below.

Eight teams participate.

Round 1

All eight teams play in Round 1.

Round 2

Round 2A

Contested by the four winners of Round 1. The winning teams advance to the semi-finals, the losing teams to the 'official' quarter-finals.

Round 2B

Contested by the four losers of Round 1. The winning teams advance to the quarter-finals, The two losing teams contest the Relegation Playoff.

Quarter-finals
 
The two losers of round 2A (who won a match and lost a match) play the two winners of round 2B (who lost a match and won a match). These two matches are referred to as quarter-finals, with the winners playing the winners of round 2A in the semi-finals.

Semi-finals

The winners of round 2A play the winners of the two quarter-finals.

Final

The winners of this year's Christy Ring Cup (tier 2) enter this year's All-Ireland Senior Hurling Championship in the preliminary round of the All-Ireland qualifiers (passed at GAA congress in February 2017). They are also promoted to play in the qualifier group of next year's Leinster Senior Hurling Championship.

Bracket

Relegation playoff

Contested by the two losing teams from round 2B. Both these teams lost their first two matches. Normally Roscommon would have been relegated as they lost this play-off match. Due to the major reorganisation of hurling in September 2018, Roscommon remained in the Christy Ring Cup.

Scoring statistics

Top scorers overall

Top scorers in a single game

References

Christy Ring Cup
Christy Ring Cup